Scopula acinosa is a moth of the family Geometridae. It is found on the island of São Tomé.

References

Moths described in 1932
acinosa
Moths of São Tomé and Príncipe
Fauna of São Tomé Island
Taxa named by Louis Beethoven Prout